Giorgia Gueglio (born 1973) is an Italian singer and founding member of the heavy metal band Mastercastle.

Biography 

She started singing in 1990, following her passion for singers like David Coverdale, Robert Plant and Ian Gillan.

From 1994 she entered many hard rock and heavy metal bands. In 2004, she became a member of the gothic metal project Artisluna, featuring the first Labyrinth drummer Mattia Stancioiu, who was also the producer. Another musician involved in the project was guitar player Pier Gonella, member of Labyrinth and Necrodeath.

In 2008, she founded the band Mastercastle together with  Pier Gonella. With this band she published the album The Phoenix in 2009 and the album Last Desire in 2010, both under the label Lion Music.

In 2001 she was contacted for a collaboration by the extreme metal band Necrodeath. She recorded the voice of the song "Queen of Desire (onyric version)", included on their album The Age of Fear, released on 26 May 2011 by Scarlet Records.

Discography

Albums 
 2009 – Mastercastle – The Phoenix
 2010 – Mastercastle – Last Desire
 2011 – Mastercastle – Dangerous Diamonds

Collaborations 
 2011 – Necrodeath – The Age of Fear (voice on track 14)
 2011 – Embrace the Sun (guest in the track 14: Sakura)
 2012 – Athlantis – M.W.N.D. (voice on track 9)

References

External links and references 
 Giorgia Gueglio's official myspace site
 A recent Gueglio's interviews

1973 births
Living people
Italian women singer-songwriters
Italian singer-songwriters
Italian rock singers
Women heavy metal singers
Italian heavy metal musicians
Musicians from Genoa
Mastercastle members
21st-century Italian singers
21st-century Italian women singers